Moseley's law is an empirical law concerning the characteristic x-rays emitted by atoms. The law had been  discovered and published by the English physicist Henry Moseley in 1913-1914. Until Moseley's work, "atomic number" was merely an element's place in the periodic table and was not known to be associated with any measurable physical quantity. In brief, the law states that the square root of the frequency of the emitted x-ray is approximately proportional to the atomic number.

History

The historic periodic table was roughly ordered by increasing atomic weight, but in a few famous cases the physical properties of two elements suggested that the heavier ought to precede the lighter.  An example is cobalt having a weight of 58.9 and nickel having an atomic weight of 58.7.

Henry Moseley and other physicists used x-ray diffraction to study the elements, and the results of their experiments led to organizing the periodic table by proton count.

Apparatus 
Since the spectral emissions for the lighter elements would be in the soft X-ray range (absorbed by air), the spectrometry apparatus had to be enclosed inside a vacuum. Details of the experimental setup are documented in the journal articles "The High-Frequency Spectra of the Elements" Part I and Part II.

Results 

Moseley found that the  lines (in Siegbahn notation) were indeed related to the atomic number, Z.

Following Bohr's lead, Moseley found that for the spectral lines, this relationship could be approximated by a simple formula, later called Moseley's Law.

where:
 is the frequency of the observed x-ray emission line

Derivation 

Moseley derived his formula empirically by line fitting the square roots of the X-ray frequencies plotted by atomic number, and his formula could be explained in terms of the Bohr model of the atom. 

in which
 is the permittivity of free space
 is the mass of an electron
 is the charge of an electron
 is the effective charge of the nucleus which can also be written as 
 is the quantum number of final energy level
 is the quantum number of initial energy level

It is assumed that the final energy level is less than the initial energy level.

Considering the empirically found constant that approximately reduced (or apparently "screened") the energy of the charges, Bohr's formula for Moseley's  X-ray transitions became:

or (dividing both sides by h to convert E to ):

Screening 

A simplified explanation for the effective charge of a nucleus being one less than its actual charge is that an unpaired electron in the K-shell screens it. An elaborate discussion criticizing Moseley's interpretation of screening can be found in a paper by Whitaker which is repeated in most modern texts.

A list of experimentally found X-ray transitions is available at NIST. Theoretical energies can be computed to a much greater accuracy than Moseley's law using a particle physics simulation method such as Dirac-Fock.

See also 

 Moseley's periodic law, concerning the modern periodic table
Auger electron spectroscopy, a similar phenomenon with increased x-ray yield from species of higher atomic number

References

External links
 Oxford Physics Teaching - History Archive, "Exhibit 12 - Moseley's graph" (Reproduction of the original Moseley diagram showing the square root frequency dependence)

History of physics
Atomic physics
X-rays